Dracaena angustifolia is a species of Asian tropical forest under-storey plants in the family Asparagaceae; no subspecies are listed in the Catalogue of Life.

Distribution and Description 
The native range of this species is from Bangladesh, through Indo-China and Malesia to northern Australia. In Vietnam the plant may be called phất dủ lá hẹp.

Use 

The leaves are used to make green food coloring. D. angustifolia is used traditionally as medicine for several different ailments.  It is also planted as a hedge.

References

Gallery

External links 
 
 

angustifolia
Flora of Indo-China
Flora of Malesia